Davoren may refer to:

 Iarfhlaith Davoren (born 1986), Irish footballer 
 John Davoren (1915–1997), American politician 
 John Davoren (Australian politician) (1866–1941) 
 Mark Davoren, Irish Gaelic footballer
 Wes Davoren (1928–2010), Australian politician

See also
 Davoren Park, South Australia, suburb of Adelaide
 Ó Duibh dá Bhoireann, Irish surname

Anglicised Irish-language surnames